Monique Jansen (born 3 October 1978, Harderwijk) is a Dutch athlete specializing in the discus throw. She competed for the Netherlands at the 2012 Summer Olympics, failing to qualify for the final.

Competition record

References

1978 births
Living people
Dutch female discus throwers
Athletes (track and field) at the 2012 Summer Olympics
Olympic athletes of the Netherlands
People from Harderwijk
Sportspeople from Gelderland